Carposina leptoneura is a moth in the family Carposinidae. It was described by Edward Meyrick in 1920. It is found in Australia, where it has been recorded from Western Australia.

References

Carposinidae
Moths described in 1920
Moths of Australia